Enrique Criado Navamuel Enrique Criado Navamuel (born 1981, Madrid) is a Spanish diplomat, lawyer and writer. 
He is the current Consul General of Spain in Frankfurt am Main.

Diplomatic career 
Enrique Criado studied Law at the Complutense University of Madrid and at the University of Vienna He then joined the Madrid Bar Association, but he had always in mind his desire to become a diplomat, which he did in 2007. 

After some brief periods working in the Spanish Embassies of La Habana and London, he was posted as Deputy Head of Mission at the Embassy of Spain in Kinshasa for three years.  

Between 2012 and 2015, he worked as Counselor at the Embassy of Spain in Canberra (Australia) and during 2015 and 2018 he was Deputy Head of Mission at the Embassy of Spain in Sofia (Bulgaria). In the period between 2018 and 2021 he coordinated the Geopolitical analysis area of the Ministry of defense. 

In 2012, he was awarded the Officer's Cross of the Order of Civil Merit. In 2018 he was bestowed the Officer’s Cross of Isabella the Catholic and in 2021, the Military Cross for Aeronautic merit.

Literary career 

His previous destinations and trips inspired his first book of travel literature, “Cosas que no caben en una maleta”. It was published in January 2016 by Aguilar Editorial, which belongs to Penguin Randomhouse Editorial Group. The book was translated and published in Bulgarian by Colibri Editorial. 

In 2018 he authored his second book of travel narrative, “El paraguas balcánico”, also published by Penguin Randomhouse.

In 2020 Sial Pigmalion editorial published his third book, “Muchas vidas y un destino”, a collective work coordinated and co-authored by Enrique Criado.

References

External links 
 https://www.youtube.com/watch?v=hwBcgggrfAU

1981 births
Living people
Spanish diplomats
Spanish writers